The 2013 Formula Renault 2.0 Northern European Cup was the eighth Formula Renault 2.0 Northern European Cup season, an open-wheel motor racing series for emerging young racing drivers based in Europe. The season began at Hockenheimring on 7 April and ended on 14 October at Zandvoort, after sixteen races at seven events.

The title was clinched by Fortec Motorsports driver Matt Parry, who won five races. His teammate Jack Aitken finished as runner-up after five podium finishes. Dennis Olsen with three podiums completed the top three in the drivers' standings. Wins in other races were shared between non-regular drivers Oliver Rowland, Steijn Schothorst, Andrea Pizzitola, Esteban Ocon, Óscar Tunjo and Jake Dennis.

Drivers and teams

Race calendar and results
The seven-event calendar for the 2013 season was revealed on 2 November 2012.

Championship standings
 Championship points were awarded on a 30, 24, 20, 17, 16, 15, 14, 13, 12, 11, 10, 9, 8, 7, 6, 5, 4, 3, 2, 1 to the top 20 classified finishers in each race.

Footnotes

References

External links
 Official website of the Formula Renault 2.0 NEC championship

NEC
Formula Renault 2.0 NEC
Formula Renault 2.0 NEC
Renault NEC